"Take It to da House" is a song by Trick Daddy, released as the first single from his fourth studio album, Thugs Are Us. The song features verses by Slip-N-Slide representatives, Sung, Money Mark, J.V., Trina, and Co. They all went under the alias 'the Slip-N-Slide Express'. The song heavily samples "Boogie Shoes" by KC and the Sunshine Band and also contains samples from James Brown's "The Boss". The song was featured in the films Osmosis Jones, The Real Cancun, and Are We Done Yet?. It also plays in the end credits of Nickelodeon Magazines Big 10th Birthday Special.

"Take It to da House" placed at No. 23 on the Billboard Hot R&B/Hip-Hop Singles & Tracks chart and No. 20 on the Hot Rap Singles chart.

Charts

Weekly charts

Year-end charts

Release history

References

External links
 Music video

2001 singles
Trick Daddy songs
Trina songs
Songs written by Trick Daddy
2000 songs
Atlantic Records singles